King's Garden (Danish, Kongens Have) is a large, formal palace park in central Odense, Denmark. Located directly across from the Odense station, it is bounded by Railroad Street to the west and Eastern Stationsvej to the north. It stands in front of Odense Palace.

The original Baroque garden was constructed around 1720 by Johan Cornelius Krieger to share French design with its central axis and symmetrical lines. About 100 years later, it was changed into an English-style garden with curved lines. There are two statues, including one of Hans Christian Andersen, erected by the school children of Denmark.

References

Buildings and structures in Odense
1720 establishments in Denmark
Gardens in Denmark
Parks in Denmark